The Great State of Massachusetts, words by George A. Wells, and music by J. Earl Bley, was designated the state glee club song of Massachusetts on November 24, 1997.

Wells, a politician from Worcester, Massachusetts, was a delegate to the 1960 Democratic National Convention, which nominated Massachusetts' John F. Kennedy as president. The convention band was unable to find a song that identified Kennedy with his home state and on his way home, Wells wrote The Great State of Massachusetts. J. Earl Bley, a musician friend of Wells, wrote the music. On November 24, 1997, The Great State of Massachusetts was designated the state glee club song of Massachusetts by the Massachusetts General Court.

References

Massachusetts
Symbols of Massachusetts
Music of Massachusetts
1960 songs
Songs about Massachusetts